Neguac is a Canadian village in Northumberland County, New Brunswick.

Geography
Situated on the north shore of Miramichi Bay at the southern end of the Acadian Peninsula, the village is located 44 kilometres northeast of Miramichi.  Approximately 92 percent of its residents are francophone.

History

Neguac calls itself the "Savoie Capital of Canada", as most Acadians with that surname trace their ancestry to the Neguac area. The first settlers in the village, Jean Savoie and his family, arrived in the area in 1757, two years after the Expulsion of the Acadians. In 2007, the community celebrated its 250th anniversary and 40th anniversary of incorporation.

Economy
The local economy is based on fishing and forestry, of which oyster farming and lobster fishing are the main industry. Seasonally, from August to mid-September blueberries are harvested, and from late October to early December Christmas wreaths are made and sold around Canada and the Continental United States, these industries play an important role in the local economy.

The community has two wharves situated in its municipal limits. It also has a large fish plant that processes lobster and herring.

Neguac is considered the Oyster Hub of Atlantic Canada. Its oysters are distributed throughout the world via the Maison Beausoleil Company.

In April 2003, a call centre was opened by Virtual-Agent Services (VAS). It employed nearly thirty call centre representatives. The call centre was closed August 26, 2011, when VAS was acquired by Thing5. The building now houses the Alnwick Resource Centre (Food Bank).

The community is a service centre of the Miramichi Bay area offering government services, a health clinic, restaurants, gas stations and other retail stores and services.

Demographics

Population trend

Mother tongue (2016)

Notable people
Frederick W. MILLS

See also

List of communities in New Brunswick

References

External links
 Village of Neguac

Communities in Northumberland County, New Brunswick
Villages in New Brunswick